Cychrus toledanoi is a species of ground beetle in the subfamily of Carabinae. It was described by Cavazzuti in 2008.

References

toledanoi
Beetles described in 2008